Arthur Dutton may refer to:

 Arthur Henry Dutton (1838–1864), American soldier
 Arthur Brandreth Scott Dutton (1876–1932), Royal Navy officer